Therese Johaug (born 25 June 1988) is a Norwegian cross-country skier from the village of Dalsbygda in Os municipality who has competed for the clubs Tynset IF and IL Nansen. In World Ski Championships she has won ten individual gold medals along with four gold medals in relays, and she is a four-time Olympic gold medallist.

In October 2016, Johaug tested positive for the performance-enhancing drug clostebol. She blamed the Norwegian team medic Fredrik S. Bendiksen but was suspended for 18 months. She returned to the World Cup in 2019 and has continued to dominate women's distance competitions in the following seasons.

On 4 March 2022, Therese Johaug announced her retirement from elite cross-country skiing following the 2021–2022 season.

Athletic career
After skiing some domestic races in the 2006 season, Johaug took part at the Norwegian Championships in 2007, winning a bronze at the 7.5 km + 7.5 km double pursuit event. She was selected for two World Cup races before the World Championships, finishing eighth and 33rd in two interval start races over 10 km, which was enough to be selected for competition in the 30 km distance at the 2007 Sapporo World Championships where she won a surprising bronze medal.

At the 2010 Winter Olympics in Vancouver, she won gold in the 4 × 5 km relay, came sixth in the 15 km pursuit and seventh in the 30 km mass start (classic) race.

Johaug won her first individual gold medal in the 30 km mass start race at the 2011 World Championships in Oslo. She also won gold in the 4 x 5 km relay, bronze in the 7.5 km + 7.5 km double pursuit and fourth in the 10 km individual start. At the 2013 World Championships, she won her second individual gold medal in the 10 km freestyle race.

At the 2014 Winter Olympics in Sochi, she won the silver medal in the 30 km mass start (free), the bronze medal in the 10 km classical, and finished fourth in the 15 km skiathlon.

Johaug and compatriot Martin Johnsrud Sundby became the first Norwegians to win the Tour de Ski when they won the women's and men's competitions in the 2013–14 edition of the race. Johaug subsequently won the overall and distance competitions in the 2013–14 FIS Cross-Country World Cup.

She won the Birkebeinerrennet ski marathon in 2015 with a time of 2.41.46. That year she also enjoyed her most successful World Championship performance in Falun, where she took three gold medals: two in individual events (the 15km skiathlon and the 30km classic mass start) and one as part of the Norwegian women's team in the 4x5km relay.

Johaug followed her World Championship success with her best-ever World Cup season in 2015–16, winning a second Tour de Ski by overturning a 39-second deficit to Ingvild Flugstad Østberg on the final stage to complete the climb up Alpe Cermis with a lead of 2 minutes 21 seconds over runner-up Østberg. She went on to capture the overall and distance World Cups, rounding off her season by winning the inaugural Ski Tour Canada in a similar fashion to her Tour de Ski win, eradicating Heidi Weng's 30-second lead on the final stage pursuit to take victory by over a minute.

Until 2016 Egil Kristiansen coached Johaug, and was described (by media) as "in reality her best coach ... [and he had] helped her master freestyle" skiing.

In August 2019, Johaug competed in the Norwegian national athletics championship and won the 10,000 metres on 32:20.87. She followed this up with a time of 31:33.15 in May 2021 falling just 8 seconds short of an Olympic berth.

Doping
In September 2016, Johaug tested positive for a performance-enhancing drug called Clostebol, an anabolic steroid. Johaug said that the substance came from an ointment for her sore, sunburnt lips, which she used from 4 to 15 September. She claims to have used the ointment called Trofodermin. It contains Clostebol. The word "Doping" behind a 'No Symbol' is normally printed on the back of its packaging in Italy; however, it's not an international or European standardized marking, it's not used in Norway, and some argue it can be interpreted inversely and should instead be an open circle. Johaug said that the drug was given to her by the team's physician, Fredrik S. Bendiksen. Bendiksen said that he did not notice that it contained a forbidden substance. Under interrogation, he explained how in retrospect, a combination of three causes reduced his focus to allow the unlikely mistake to occur: 1) His wife's eye surgery (potentially cancer) had him to have to leave Livigno the next day. 2) Another athlete was hospitalized, 3) He had to prepare for a press conference presentation about the team's asthma medication protocols the next day. After the incident he resigned his position as a team's physician, but he remains closely associated with elite Norwegian skiing. Bendiksen had previously worked for Pfizer, the medical company that produces the salve in question, but it is not a product marketed in Norway.

Several pieces of evidence corroborated Johaug's testimony. Her lip symptom was pictured in media two days after the cream was bought. A receipt and the doctor's bank statement existed for purchase of the cream on the claimed date. Johaug filed the drug on the doping form prior to testing. The latter is quite extraordinary to alert the doping agency of which uncommon substance to test for when you don't have a Therapeutic Use Exemption (TUE). It was also expressed by the plaintiff (FIS) that "the Clostebol found in Ms Johaug's system was a result of inadvertence" and that "she did not act with intention to cheat or gain any competitive advantage", but that "failing to examine the box and entirely missing the warning sign" did not put her in the 'No Fault (NF)' category, but rather in the 'No Significant Fault (NSF)' category, which under the WADA code warrants a 12-24mth suspension.

The concentration of clostebol that was measured in her blood is by itself consistent with her explanation of using Trofodermin on her lips right before the test was taken. It is also consistent with using Clostebol in large doses in the weeks before the test. The positive drug test was taken after Johaug did not have any doping control for a period of four months.

On 19 October, Johaug was suspended by Anti-Doping Norway for two months while the case was investigated. The Norwegian Olympic Committee later gave Johaug a 13-month suspension. This ban would have expired in time to allow Johaug to compete in the 2018 Winter Olympics, but in March 2017, the International Ski Federation appealed this decision.  They argued that the suspension was at the low end of applicable suspensions and failed to reflect the fact that the athlete had missed a printed doping warning label. On 22 August 2017 the Court of Arbitration for Sport (CAS) issued a decision "in which Ms Johaug is suspended for a period of 18 months commencing on 18 October 2016". As a result of the suspension Johaug was not able to participate in the 2018 Winter Olympics.

Cross-country skiing results
All results are sourced from the International Ski Federation (FIS).

Olympic Games
 6 medals – (4 gold, 1 silver, 1 bronze)

World Championships
 19 medals – (14 gold, 2 silver, 3 bronze)

World Cup
 8 titles – (3 overall, 5 distance)

Individual podiums
 82 victories – (45 , 37 )
 149 podiums – (82 , 67 )

Team podiums
 18 victories – (18 ) 
 22 podiums – (22 )

Overall record

a.  Classification is made according to FIS classification.
b.  Includes individual and mass start races.
c.  Includes pursuit and double pursuit races.
d.  Withdrawn from 2009–10 Tour de Ski.

Sponsors
As of 13 October 2016, her sponsors were Tag Heuer, Huawei, Isklar and Eger.

The sponsorship with Huawei, ended in December 2020.

References

External links

 Official website 
 
 
 
 
 

1988 births
Living people
People from Os, Innlandet
Cross-country skiers at the 2010 Winter Olympics
Cross-country skiers at the 2014 Winter Olympics
Cross-country skiers at the 2022 Winter Olympics
Norwegian female cross-country skiers
Olympic cross-country skiers of Norway
Olympic gold medalists for Norway
Olympic silver medalists for Norway
Olympic bronze medalists for Norway
Olympic medalists in cross-country skiing
FIS Nordic World Ski Championships medalists in cross-country skiing
FIS Cross-Country World Cup champions
Medalists at the 2010 Winter Olympics
Medalists at the 2014 Winter Olympics
Medalists at the 2022 Winter Olympics
Doping cases in cross-country skiing
Norwegian sportspeople in doping cases
Tour de Ski winners
Tour de Ski skiers
Norwegian female long-distance runners
Norwegian Athletics Championships winners
Sportspeople from Innlandet